Xirayas de San Luis–OPW (UCI code XSL) is a professional women's cycling team, based in Argentina, which is scheduled to compete in elite road bicycle racing events.

Major wins
2015
 Argentine rider classification Tour Femenino de San Luis, Maria Carla Alvarez
Stage 6, Alison Tetrick
2016
 National Time Trial championships, Estefania Pilz

National champions
2016
 Argentine Time Trial, Estefania Pilz
 Argentine Road Race, Maria Carla Álvarez

Team roster

References

UCI Women's Teams
Cycling teams established in 2015
Cycling teams based in Argentina